

Portugal
 Angola – 
 Fonseca Coutinho, Governor of Angola (1748–1749)
 António de Almeida, Governor of Angola (1749–1753)
 Macau –
 Jose Placido de Matos Saraiva, Governor of Macau (1747–1749)
 Diogo Fernandes Salema e Saldanha, Governor of Macau (1749–1752)

Colonial governors
Colonial governors
1749